Mukim Seria is a mukim in Belait District, Brunei. The mukim encompasses Seria, one of the only two towns in the district. It is home to the oil and gas industry of the country.

Geography 
The mukim is located in the north-west of the Belait District, bordering the South China Sea to the north, Mukim Liang to the east, Mukim Labi to the south-east, Mukim Kuala Balai to the south and Mukim Kuala Belait to the west.

The primary settlements within the mukim include Seria town, Kampong Sungai Bera, Kampong Lorong Tiga Selatan and Panaga.

Demographics 
As of 2016 census, the population was 21,214 with  males and  females. The mukim had 4,471 households occupying 4,297 dwellings. Among the population,  lived in urban areas, while the remainder of  lived in rural areas.

Villages  
As of 2016, the mukim comprised the following census villages:

Infrastructures

Public housing 

Other locations 
The following places are located within the mukim:
 Seria oil field, the oldest oil field in Brunei
 Anduki Airfield, one of the only two airports in Brunei
 British Forces Brunei camps, existed since the 1960s
 The headquarters of Brunei Shell Petroleum
 Badas Water Treatment Plant, which supplies raw water from the Belait River to the residents in Belait District

References 

Seria
Belait District